Makary is a town in Logone-et-Chari, Far North Region, Cameroon, West Africa. The town is located on the right (east) bank of a distributary of the Chari River in the delta just before it enters Lake Chad. The people are known as Kotoko, and the local language is Mpade, Fulani (Fulfulde) is the trade language. The primary economic activity was and is fishing.

History
Makary was part of the indigenous Sao civilisation that occupied the land south of Lake Chad from about the Sixth Century A.D. going into decline by at least the Fourteenth Century. With the decline of the Sao confederation, Makary was an independent kingdom, one of the Kotoko kingdom city-states. In the early Fifteenth Century, Makary went from being an ally of King Idris Alooma to being a part of the Bornu Empire,  and soon converted to Islam. However, by the late Eighteenth Century, although nominally still part of Bornu, the city states had reasserted themselves, and by 1800 Makary had formed a federation of seven  fortified towns under the prince (Mé) of Makary.

In March 1846 Umar of Borno, nominal general of the Bornu sultan Ibrahim, suffered a defeat at Kousséri by the forces of the Kingdom of Baguirmi, itself weakened by attacks from the Wadai Empire. By the 1890s Rabih az-Zubayr was able to move into the power vacuum created by these contending forces and took first Oubangui-Chari, then Baguirmi, and then in 1894 Bornu. This soon brought Makary under Rabih's control. After Rabih was killed by the French in 1900, Makary fell under the German sphere of influence.

Despite the changes in rulers and religion the culture of Makary seems to represent an uninterrupted continuation of the original Sao culture.

Villages
 Bodo
 Goura

Geography
Makary sits on the delta; however the river bed of the Chari River is dry most of the year, only filling with the onset of the rainy season in July and drying up again by the end of October.

Climate
Makary has a hot desert climate (BWh) with little to no rain in all months except July, August and September.

Notes

Populated places in Cameroon
Communes of Far North Region (Cameroon)